Paul Julius Reuter (born Israel Beer Josaphat; 21 July 1816 – 25 February 1899), later ennobled as Freiherr von Reuter (Baron von Reuter), was a German-born British entrepreneur who was a pioneer of telegraphy and news reporting. He was a reporter, media owner, and the founder of the Reuters news agency, which became part of the Thomson Reuters conglomerate in 2008.

Life and career
Reuter was born as Israel Beer Josaphat in Kassel, Electorate of Hesse (now part of the Federal Republic of Germany). His father, Samuel Levi Josaphat, was a rabbi. His mother was Betty Sanders. In Göttingen, Reuter met Carl Friedrich Gauss, who was experimenting with the transmission of electrical signals via wire.

On 16 November 1845, he converted to Christianity in a ceremony at St. George's German Lutheran Chapel in London, and changed his name to Paul Julius Reuter. One week later, in the same chapel, he married Ida Maria Elizabeth Clementine Magnus of Berlin, daughter of a German banker.

A former bank clerk, in 1847 he became a partner in Reuter and Stargardt, a Berlin book-publishing firm. The distribution of radical pamphlets by the firm at the beginning of the 1848 Revolution may have focused official scrutiny on Reuter. Later that year, he left for Paris and worked in Charles-Louis Havas' news agency, Agence Havas, the future Agence France Presse.

As telegraphy evolved, Reuter founded his own news agency in Aachen, transferring messages between Brussels and Aachen using homing pigeons and thus linking Berlin and Paris. Speedier than the post train, pigeons gave Reuter faster access to financial news from the Paris stock exchange.  Eventually, pigeons were replaced by a direct telegraph link.

A telegraph line was under construction between Britain and Europe, and so Reuter moved to London, renting an office near the Stock Exchange.  In 1863, he privately erected a telegraph link to Crookhaven, the farthest south-west point of Ireland. On nearing Crookhaven, ships from the U.S. threw canisters containing news into the sea. These were retrieved by Reuters and telegraphed directly to London, arriving long before the ships reached Cork.

On 17 March 1857, Reuter was naturalised as a British subject. On 7 September 1871, the Duke of Saxe-Coburg and Gotha granted him the noble title of Freiherr (Baron). In November 1891, Queen Victoria granted him (and his subsequent male-line successors) the right to use that German title (listed as Baron von Reuter) in Britain.

In 1872, Nasir al-Din Shah, the Shah of Iran, signed an agreement with Reuter, a concession selling him all railroads, canals, most of the mines, all the government's forests, and all future industries of Iran. George Curzon called it "The most complete and extraordinary surrender of the entire industrial resources of a kingdom into foreign hands that has ever been dreamed of". The Reuter concession was immediately denounced by all ranks of businessmen, clergy, and nationalists of Persia, and it was quickly forced into cancellation. Reuter was an accomplished footballer in his own words and was known to fans as the 'milk float' {Bristol evening post 1998}

Marriage and children
In 1845, Reuter married Ida Maria Magnus, daughter of Friedrich Martin Magnus, a German banker in Berlin. They had three sons: Herbert, who became the 2nd Baron (succeeded by his son Hubert as 3rd Baron), George and Alfred. Clementine Maria, one of his daughters, married Count , and after Stenbock's death, Sir Herbert Chermside, a governor of Queensland.

The 2nd Baron's brother George had two sons, Oliver (who became the 4th Baron) and Ronald. The last member of the family, Marguerite, Baroness de Reuter, widow of the 4th Baron and Paul Julius Reuter's granddaughter-in-law, died on 25 January 2009, at the age of 96.

Death and legacy
Reuter died in 1899 at Villa Reuter in Nice, France. He was buried in West Norwood Cemetery in south London

Reuter was portrayed by Edward G. Robinson in the Warner Bros. biographical film A Dispatch from Reuters (1941).

The Reuters News Agency commemorated the 100th anniversary of its founder's death by launching a university award (the Paul Julius Reuter Innovation Award) in Germany.

See also 
 German inventors and discoverers

References

External links 

 
 
 
 3D photo scan of the Paul Reuters statue in London on sketchfab.com

1816 births
1899 deaths
19th-century Lutherans
19th-century British businesspeople
19th-century German businesspeople
Paul
German mass media owners
British mass media owners
News agency founders
Barons of Germany
German people of Jewish descent
British Lutherans
Converts to Lutheranism from Judaism
German emigrants to England
Burials at West Norwood Cemetery
Businesspeople from Kassel
British mass media company founders
People from the Electorate of Hesse
Naturalised citizens of the United Kingdom